Pool 4 of the 1987 Rugby World Cup began on 23 May and was completed on 2 June. The pool was composed of France, Scotland, Romania and Zimbabwe.

Standings

Romania vs Zimbabwe

France vs Scotland

France vs Romania

Scotland vs Zimbabwe

Romania vs Scotland

France vs Zimbabwe

External links
 Official Rugby World Cup Site
 Full Results and Statistics at ESPN

Pool 4
rugby union
rugby union
1987–88 in Scottish rugby union
1987–88 in French rugby union